The Mall, Sofia, also known as Tsarigradsko Mall, was (until 2013) the largest shopping mall in the Balkans. Opened in spring 2010, The Mall claims it has a total built area of 62,000 square metres (667,000 sq ft) on six stories, three of which are underground. It claims to contain more than 240 shops, restaurants, recreations centres, bars, cafeterias. The Mall has a parking capacity for more than 2,800 vehicles. Bulgaria's largest Carrefour hypermarket at 9,000 square metres (97,000 sq ft) was within the Mall. The Mall can be found at 115 Tsarigradsko Shose. Beside the mall lies a business centre and the headquarters of Vivacom — the largest telecommunications company in Bulgaria. As of 2010, it has created 1,500 new jobs.

See also 
List of shopping malls in Sofia
List of shopping malls in Bulgaria

References

External links
Official website

Shopping malls in Sofia
Commercial buildings completed in 2010
Shopping malls established in 2010